Raimonds Feldmanis (born 4 April 1982 in Rīga) is a Latvian former professional basketball player and professional basketball coach who helped Latvian 3x3 national team win gold medals in 2020 Summer Olympics.

Playing career
Feldmanis was a professional basketball player having played domestically for teams in Latvian Basketball League. He also had stints in Spain with teams from Liga EBA. Feldmanis won Latvian Basketball League title in 2010 with BK Barons.

Coaching career
Feldmanis worked with professional and youth national teams in Latvia, developed several top European prospects, such as Rodions Kurucs. In 2017, Feldmanis won Latvian championship with VEF Rīga. In February 2018, Feldmanis coached VEF Skola at the Big Baller Brand International Tournament where his team debuted by erasing 29-point first quarter deficit in a game against Vytautas Prienai–Birštonas, a team that had LaMelo Ball on its roster. Feldmanis was part of the New Orleans Pelicans coaching staff twice in the NBA Summer League, in 2017 and 2018 respectively.  In 2021, he led 3x3 Latvian National Team to the first-ever appearance in the Olympic Games where his team won the gold medal.

Outside professional basketball
He is the founder of TRUBasketball, a non-profit basketball organization in Latvia that specializes in youth sports movement. Feldmanis contributed in publishing self-help book, Basketball Blueprint: A Complete Guide to Master Your Skills, in 2021.

National level
 2013: Latvia U-20 coach
 2014: Latvian U-18 coach
 2015: Latvian U-18 coach
 2016: Latvian U-18 head coach
 2017: Latvian U-20 coach
 2019: Latvian U-20 head coach
 2019–2021: Latvia national basketball team coach
 2018–present: Latvia 3x3 national team head coach
 2022: Ukraine national basketball team coach

Achievements
 Silver in FIBA Europe Under-20 Championship (2013)
 Gold in Latvian Basketball League (2017)
 Silver in FIBA 3x3 Europe Cup (2018)
 Silver in FIBA 3x3 World Cup (2019)
 Gold in FIBA 3x3 World Tour (2020)
 Gold in Tokyo Olympic Games (2021)
 Silver in FIBA 3x3 Under-U17 Europe Cup (2022)
 Silver in FIBA 3x3 Europe cup (2022)

Personal Awards
 Latvian Basketball Coach of the Year (2021)
 Coach of the Year in Latvia (2021)

References

External links
  Personal Website 

1982 births
Living people
Basketball players from Riga
Latvian basketball coaches
Latvian men's basketball players
Latvian expatriate basketball people in Spain